Aegires petalis is a species of sea slug. It is a dorid nudibranch, a shell-less marine gastropod mollusc in the family Aegiridae.

Distribution 
This species was described from Anemone Reef, Madang, Papua New Guinea. It has also been reported from Japan.

References

Aegiridae
Gastropods described in 2004